Amaurote is a British video game for 8-bit computer systems that was released in 1987 by Mastertronic on their Mastertronic Added Dimension label. The music for the game was written by David Whittaker.

Plot
From the game's instructions:

The city of Amaurote has been invaded by huge, aggressive insects who have built colonies in each of the city's 25 sectors. As the only uninjured army officer left after the invasion (that'll teach you for hiding!) the job falls to you to destroy all the insect colonies.

Gameplay

The player controls an "Arachnus 4", an armoured fighting-machine that moves on four legs. The player must first select a sector to play in via a map screen and then control the Arachnus as it wanders an isometric (top-down in the Commodore 64 version) view of the cityscape attacking marauding insects and searching for the insect queen using a scanner. The Arachnus attacks by launching bouncing bombs. It can only launch one at a time so if a bomb misses its intended target the player will have to wait until it hits the scenery or bounces against the fence of the play area before firing again. Once the queen has been located, the player can radio-in a "supa-bomb" which can be used to destroy the queen. The player can also radio-in other supplies such as additional bombs and even ask to be pulled out of the combat zone. Extra weaponry costs the player "dosh", the in-game currency.

Reception
The game was favourably reviewed by Crash magazine who said it was graphically impressive, well designed and fun to play.  It was given a 92% overall rating. Zzap!64 were less impressed by the Commodore 64 version which was criticised for dull gameplay and programming bugs. It was rated 39% overall.

References

External links

Amaurote at Atari Mania

1987 video games
Action video games
Amstrad CPC games
Atari 8-bit family games
Binary Design games
Commodore 64 games
Fictional populated places
Mastertronic games
MSX games
Single-player video games
Video games about insects
Video games about robots
Video games developed in the United Kingdom
Video games scored by David Whittaker
Video games with isometric graphics
ZX Spectrum games